Beaumont Hotham, 2nd Baron Hotham (1737–1814) was an English judge and politician who sat in the House of Commons from 1768 to 1774.

Life
He was the fourth son of Sir Beaumont Hotham, 7th Baronet and his wife Frances Thompson of Welton, Yorkshire; Sir Charles Hotham-Thompson, 8th Baronet was the eldest son. He became a Lord Commissioner of the Great Seal in 1783 and a Baron of the Exchequer for thirty years, from 1784 until February 1805. He became 2nd Baron Hotham in May 1813 upon the death of his elder brother, William Hotham, 1st Baron Hotham. He was succeeded as 3rd baron by his grandson, Beaumont Hotham, 3rd Baron Hotham (1794–1870).

He was an MP for Wigan from 1768 to 1774, and helped prepare the Madhouses Act 1774. He resigned for his appointment as Baron of the Exchequer; he was then succeeded in Parliament in the by-election of 1775 by John Morton.

Family
Hotham married in 1767 Susanna Hankey, daughter of Sir Thomas Hankey, as her second husband. They had threes sons and three daughters. Of the children:

Beaumont (1768–1799) married Philadelphia Dyke (died 1808), daughter of Sir John Dixon Dyke, 3rd Baronet, and was the father of Beaumont Hotham, 3rd Baron Hotham
Henry (1777–1833), Royal Navy officer
Frederick (died 1854), a cleric.
Frances, married in 1797 John Sutton.
Amelia, married in 1798 John Woodcock.
Louisa, married firstly Sir Charles Edmonstone, 2nd Baronet, and secondly Charles Woodcock.

References

1737 births
1814 deaths
Barons of the Exchequer
Members of the Parliament of Great Britain for English constituencies
British MPs 1768–1774
British MPs 1774–1780
Barons in the Peerage of Ireland